Občine is a small settlement in the Municipality of Trebnje in eastern Slovenia. It lies west of Trebnje, just south of the A2 motorway on the regional road to Dobrnič. The area is part of the historical region of Lower Carniola. The municipality is now included in the Southeast Slovenia Statistical Region.

References

External links
Občine at Geopedia

Populated places in the Municipality of Trebnje